Pamela Janice Warhurst  (born 1950) is a British community leader, activist and environment worker best known for founding the voluntary gardening initiative, Incredible Edible, in  Todmorden, West Yorkshire. In 2009, Prince Charles visited the project in support.

Warhurst is currently Chair of Incredible Edible and Chair of the Todmorden Town Deal regeneration board  and was formerly Chair of Forestry Commission Great Britain, which is the largest land management commission in the country. She was also Chair of The Incredible Aquagarden, a social enterprise demonstrating and teaching  urban farming (dissolved) and Chair of Handmade Parade a leading community arts enterprise, a Fellow of the Royal Society of Arts & Manufacturing and is an Honorary Fellow of Landscape Institute and Leeds Becket University. She has an MA in Economics from Manchester University.

She previously served as a member of the Board of Natural England, where she was the lead non-executive board member working on the Countryside & Rights of Way Bill in 2000.
She has been both Deputy Chair and Acting Chair of the Countryside Agency, a Labour council leader on the Calderdale Council, and a board member of Yorkshire Forward. She has also chaired the National Countryside Access Forum and the Calderdale NHS Trust.

From 2005 to 2018 she took the Chair of Pennine Prospects, a regeneration company focusing on the South Pennine region of the United Kingdom. In the New Year Honours 2005 Warhurst was appointed as a Commander of the Order of the British Empire (CBE), for services to the environment.

Warhurst lives in Todmorden, West Yorkshire.

She launched Incredible Edible in Todmorden, West Yorkshire, and now,  there are 150 groups  in the UK and 1000 groups in the world. She started an experimental project focused on "eating". She sowed seeds of kidney beans and other vegetables on the ground of a dilapidated health center and put up a big sign "FOOD FOR FREE" when it was time to harvest. This is the beginning of Incredible Edible that has made a strong economic turnaround. She successfully got the desired result by this project. There are 70 areas where you can grow food and can pick them up in Todmorden. She describes the system as three spinning “plates”: community, business, and education. Each plate is an essential factor. In addition, she gave many lectures all over the world, wrote a book about this project, and posted some TED talks that have over several thousand views.

References

External links
 
 
 
"https://www.jstage.jst.go.jp/article/jwei/27/2/27_jwei270257/_pdf" (Japanese)イギリスの小さな街の大胆な改革　2014
"https://opac.ll.chiba-u.jp/da/curator/103115/S18808824-71-P006-PEN.pdf" (Japanese)食と緑の科学 第71号 HortResearch No. 71, 6-7, 2017
Foodscaping
"https://www.h.chiba-u.jp/lab/tcp/shiberareru_jing_guan/shiberareru_jing_guantoha.html"　食べられる景観とは

Living people
Commanders of the Order of the British Empire
1950 births